Viktor Yalovsky (born 1 August 1965) was a Ukrainian–Soviet professional football player.

Career
After winning the Soviet Cup with FC Metalist Kharkiv, Yalovsky played a game at the 1988–89 UEFA Cup Winners' Cup (FK Borac Banja Luka).

Honours
 Soviet Cup winner: 1987–88.

References

External links
 

1965 births
2012 deaths
Soviet footballers
Ukrainian footballers
FC Metalist Kharkiv players
SKA Kiev players
FC Zirka Kropyvnytskyi players
FC Kremin Kremenchuk players
FC Kryvbas Kryvyi Rih players
FC Torpedo Zaporizhzhia players
FC Temp Shepetivka players
FC Podillya Khmelnytskyi players
FC Skala Stryi (1911) players
FC Krystal Parkhomivka players
Ukrainian Premier League players
Ukrainian First League players
Association football defenders